Kotla Mubarakpur Complex, a medieval famous urban village, is a market place with  residential colony in South central part of New Delhi.
Kotla Mubarakpur classified by the Delhi Development Authority (D.D.A.) as an Urban Village which is dominated by  Mahawar Koli of Rajput Samaj, it is situated within touching distance of South Extension. Defence Colony lies to its east. Nearest Delhi Metro stations are South Extension, Dilli Haat - INA  and Lajpat Nagar. Its history can be traced to the prominent tomb of Muizud Din Mubarak Shah, son of Khizr Khan of the Sayyid dynasty of the fifteenth century Delhi Sultanate rule in India, and its adjoining mosque. There are several other tombs of Lodi Dynasty period such as the Darya Khan's tomb, Kale Khan ka Gumbad, Bare Khan ka Gumbad, Chote Khan Ka Gumbad and Bhure Khan ka Gumbad, and also a Baoli (step well).

Khizr Khan who was the governor of Punjab under the Lodi dynasty took over the reins at Delhi, in 1414 AD, after defeating Daulat Khan Lodi. He established the Sayyid dynasty, which had four successors till 1451 AD. His son Muizud Din Mubarak Shah succeeded him. He established a city called Mubarakabad on the banks of the Yamuna River, but no trace of it exists now. He died in 1434 AD and he was buried in Kotla Mubarakpur, named after him. His tomb was built in a fusion of Lodi style octagonal plan combined with Tughlaq style buttresses and wide dome.

History
Subsequent to the death of Nasiruddin Mahmud Shah tughlagh  of the Tughlaq Dynasty, in 1413 AD, the succession of power rested with Daulat Khan Lodi of the Lodi dynasty. But Khizr Khan who was the Governor of Punjab,usurped power on 28 May 1414, and imprisoned Daulat Khan. He then went on to establish the Sayyid dynasty rule of the Delhi sultanate (1414–1451), who claimed to be descendants of the Islamic prophet, Muhammad; there were three other rulers of this dynasty who followed him.

Khizr Khan, who founded the Sayyid dynasty, traced his ancestry to Mohammed based on a casual recognition of this claim by the famous saint Sayyid Jalal-ud-din of Bukhara. He was the viceroy of Shah Rukh, the fourth son of Timur lane. He was content with the title of Raydt-i-A'la, or 'the Exalted Standards' conferred on him. He was not only successful in uniting Punjab with Delhi and but was also able to tame the governors of several fiefdoms such as Mewat, Gwalior, Etawah and many more under his reign. During one of his campaigns, he fell seriously sick and returned to Delhi and before he died on 20 May 1421 AD, authorized the reins of power to his son Mubarak Khan. Mubarak Khan had no pretensions to assuming the title of Shah and declaring complete independence of his territory. He effectively and ruthlessly quelled the rebellious fiefdoms. He assumed the name of Muizz-ud-Din Mubarak Shah and minted coins in his name. He had adopted the practice of invading his fiefdoms to collect revenue for his coffers with effective coercion tactics. But his war campaigns had several set backs too. In the meanwhile there was a coterie of people surrounding him who were conspiring against him. In November 1442 AD, he established his new city called the Mubarakabad on the banks of the Yamuna River. After this, while returning from one of his successful war campaigns from Bhatinda in Punjab, he visited Mubarakabad, his new capital. On 14 February 1443 AD one of his disgruntled former Minister Sarvar-ul-Mulk, in association with other Hindu courtiers cleverly plotted to kill him. They were successful in brutally assassinating Mubarak Shah while he was preparing for his prayers. Since Mubarak did not have a son, Muhammad Shah, the son of his brother Farid was enthroned. A detailed account of Mubarak Shah's reign is available in the Tarikh-i-Mubarak Shahi written by Yahya-bin-Ahmad Sirhindi.

After the death of Mubarak Khan Shah, his nephew Muhammad Khan ascended the throne and styled himself as Sultan Muhammad Shah. Just before his death, Muhammad Shah called his son Ala-ud-Din from Badaun and nominated him as his successor. But both these rulers proved ineffective in providing a viable rule and in fact the last ruler of this dynasty, Ala-ud-Din Alam Shah voluntarily abdicated the throne of the Delhi sultanate in favour of Bahlul Khan Lodhi on 19 April 1451 who was then ruler of Punjab and left for Badaun. He continued to live there till his death in 1478 AD. Bahlul Khan Lodhi then went on to establish the last dynasty of the Delhi sultanate.
The rulers of the Sayyid dynasty subsisted their rule by collecting revenue by coercion. They could barely counter the pressure from the Sharqī sultans to the east and the Khokars to the northwest.
Later baisla clan of gurjars coming from haryana palwal baislat and resettled Kotla Mubarakpur

Mubarak Shah's tomb
Mubarak Shah's tomb is an impressive structure, which was built with an octagonal plan, enclosed in an octagonal compound with south and west gates exist while the compound walls and other gates have disappeared. The Sultan personally planned its construction during his lifetime. It has a southern entrance into the octagonal hall, which has arched openings on three sides, except in the west, which has the Mihrab, in the prayer direction.

The tombs of Mubarak Shah and Muhammad Shah are strikingly similar, although built ten years apart and in different locations. It is quite possible that both monuments were built by the same architect. One major difference lies in the different heights of the dome in proportion to the rest of the building. Mubarak's tomb has a dome 4 feet lower than that of Muhammad, and it makes the dome out of proportion with the rest of the building. Thus, Mubarak's dome is too small for the size of the drum and the base of the verandah, and too flat to be attractive.

A verandah, with three entrances, encloses the hall. The hall and the verandah are provided with supporting sloping buttresses at the corners. A sixteen sided fortification, with turrets in each corner, supports the low dome structure. The turrets are crowned by a lantern. Chattris (kiosks) in octagonal shape adorn the roof on each side. Three tiers of Quranic inscriptions adorn the springing of the ceiling of the dome. Though stunted in appearance, it is considered as a typical example of octagonal Sayyid tombs, which were popular during Lodi and Mughal periods. The overall effect of the tomb is of a pyramidal appearance.

Adjoining the tomb, there is a "funerary mosque" meant as a venue for prayers, and making public addresses by the visitors to the tomb. The mosque is located on the west wall of the tomb. It has two bays depth wise and five bays width wise and is decorated with arches supported on pillars (see image).

Other tombs
In the precincts of the Kotla Mubarakpur tomb and mosque, there are many other tombs of the Lodi period. These are (see gallery):

Darya Khan's tomb
Darya Khan Lohani's tomb is dated to the early 16th century. Darya Khan was the Chief Justice during the reign of Bahlol Lodi and vakil (advocate) during Sikander Lodi's rule. Considered an unusual tomb, most of the structure is in ruins. It has a commemorative circular platform structure built amidst a larger platform. Chaatris (kiosks) are seen at the corners. It has been deduced that when built the tomb had an impressive layout with a beautiful view.

 Bade Khan ka gumbad
This is an impressive tomb monument with an intricate frontage. The central bay of the tomb is flanked by three rows of three niches. The central niche in each row is larger than the other two. Another unusual depiction for a Lodi period tomb is of the octagonal shaped turrets at the four corners. Chattris (12 pillared) adorn the top of the four turrets. The interior of the domed Chatris have ornamentation with incised and painted plaster bands with a decorative medallion in the centre.

Chote Khan ka gumbad
This tomb considered to be built in "classic proportions" is located next to the Bade Khan's tomb, which has a wonderful well maintained interior. The exterior walls of the tomb, particularly at the entry, has carved plasterwork.

Kale Khan ka gumbad
This tomb is dated to 1481 AD as per an inscription on the Mihrab inside the tomb. Kale Khan was a courtier in the Lodi period during the reign of Bahlol Lodi. It is conjectured that his father was Darya Khan Lohani. There is a tall cenotaph in an otherwise usual Lodi type tomb. It is stated to be the earliest dated tomb of the Lodi period.

Visitor information
Kotla Mubarakapur and South Extension are busy city centres easily approachable by road, rail and air communications. The main artery, Ring Road of Delhi, passes near Kotla Mubarakpur complex.

Gallery

Notes

Neighbourhoods in Delhi
Sayyid dynasty
Mosques in Delhi
Retail markets in Delhi
Archaeological monuments in Delhi
New Delhi district
Villages in New Delhi district
Religious buildings and structures completed in 1434